Devils Mountain Lodge Airport  is an airport located two nautical miles (4 km) north of the central business district of Nabesna, Alaska. It is owned by Devils Mountain Lodge.

Facilities and aircraft 
Devils Mountain Lodge Airport has one runway designated 14/32 with a gravel and dirt surface measuring 2,000 by 40 feet (610 x 12 m). For the 12-month period ending October 15, 1975, the airport had 1,200 aircraft operations, an average of 100 per month: 58% general aviation and 42% air taxi.

References

External links
 Topographic map from USGS The National Map

Airports in Copper River Census Area, Alaska